Computer analyst may refer to:
 Programmer
 Programmer analyst
 Software analyst
 Business analyst
 Systems analyst
 Application analyst